Mesophleps safranella is a moth of the family Gelechiidae. It is found in Niger, Benin, Kenya, Malawi, Madagascar, Réunion and on the Seychelles.

The wingspan is 11.5–14 mm. The forewings are yellowish brown to ochreous brown, the dorsum sometimes darker greyish brown.

The larvae feed on Acacia species and Albizia lebbeck. They live in the pods.

References

Moths described in 1965
Mesophleps